Club Deportivo Aviación is a football team based in Madrid in the autonomous community of Community of Madrid. Founded in 1970.The historic field Pedro Vives was demolished by order of the City Council of Madrid 11-11-2014. Its current field is Parque de las Cruces.

Season to season

0 seasons in Tercera División

External links
League/Liga
Profile/Plantilla

Football clubs in Madrid
Divisiones Regionales de Fútbol clubs
Association football clubs established in 1970
1970 establishments in Spain